Francis J. McMahon is an American psychiatric geneticist and Chief of the Human Genetics Branch at the National Institute of Mental Health. He is also a visiting professor of psychiatry at the Johns Hopkins University School of Medicine and a former president of the International Society of Psychiatric Genetics. His research focuses on the genetic basis of mood and anxiety disorders, as well as the role of genetics in both positive and negative responses to antidepressant drugs. He is a fellow of the American College of Neuropsychopharmacology, and he received the Colvin Mood Disorders Prize from the Brain & Behavior Research Foundation in 2016.

References

External links
Faculty page

American geneticists
American psychiatrists
Psychiatric geneticists
Living people
National Institutes of Health faculty
University of Pennsylvania alumni
Johns Hopkins School of Medicine alumni
Johns Hopkins University faculty
University of Chicago faculty
Year of birth missing (living people)